Brachodes tristis is a moth of the family Brachodidae. It is found in Bulgaria, North Macedonia, Greece and the Near East.

The wingspan is 20–23 mm. The forewings are orange brown with a black margin.

References

Moths described in 1879
Brachodidae
Moths of Europe
Moths of Asia